Rafał Grzelak (born 24 June 1982) is a Polish professional footballer who plays as a left winger for KP Starogard Gdański.

Career 
Born in Łódź, Grzelak made his Ekstraklasa debut on 22 May 1999 for ŁKS Łódź against Wisła Kraków.

He spent the 2006–07 season on loan at Boavista from Pogon Szczecin. In June 2007, he signed a three-year deal with the Portuguese club. He transferred to Greek side Skoda Xanthi in January 2008. On 30 June 2009, it was reported that Steaua București have signed the Polish midfielder from Skoda Xanthi.

On 23 July 2009, he scored his first goal for Steaua București in a UEFA Europa League match against Újpest FC; he scored the second goal in the 2–1 victory. On 2 August 2009, Grzelak played his first Liga I match in Steaua's shirt against Ceahlăul Piatra Neamţ, Steaua won away with 2–0.

In January 2010, Grzelak was demoted to the B squad.

In August 2011, he joined Ruch Chorzów on a one-year contract.

Grzela joined kKP Starogard Gdański in July 2018.

Career statistics

Club

Honours

Club
Lech Poznan
 Polish Cup: 2003–04

International
Poland
 U-18 European Champion: 2001

References

External links
 Rafał Grzelak's profile at SteauaFC.com 
 
 
 

1982 births
Living people
Footballers from Łódź
Association football midfielders
Polish footballers
Poland international footballers
MSV Duisburg players
Widzew Łódź players
ŁKS Łódź players
Arka Gdynia players
Ruch Chorzów players
Flota Świnoujście players
Chojniczanka Chojnice players
Boavista F.C. players
Xanthi F.C. players
FC Steaua București players
FC Steaua II București players
Polish expatriate footballers
Expatriate footballers in Germany
Expatriate footballers in Greece
Expatriate footballers in Romania
Expatriate footballers in Portugal
Polish expatriate sportspeople in Portugal
Polish expatriate sportspeople in Romania
Primeira Liga players
Liga I players
Super League Greece players
Ekstraklasa players
2. Bundesliga players